The municipalities are the first-order administrative divisions of North Macedonia.

North Macedonia is currently organized into 80 municipalities (opštini; singular: општина, opština, Albanian: komunat; singular: komuna), established in February 2013; 10 of the municipalities constitute the City of Skopje (or Greater Skopje), a distinct unit of local self-governance and the country's capital.

Most of the current municipalities were unaltered or merely amalgamated from the previous 123 municipalities established in September 1996; others were consolidated and their borders changed. Prior to this, local government was organized into 34 administrative districts, communes, or counties (also opštini). In 2004 they were reduced to 84, and in 2013, the following municipalities were merged into the Kičevo Municipality: Drugovo, Zajas, Oslomej and Vraneštica.

In turn, North Macedonia is subdivided into eight statistical regions (Macedonian: статистички региони, statistički regioni; Albanian: rajonet statistike), established in 2007 and based on the municipal framework; one of these regions, Skopje, encompasses Greater Skopje and the surrounding area.

Map
Map of the municipalities of North Macedonia, with the city of Skopje indicated on the map as 1.
The map shows the rural and the urban municipalities. The numbers of the map correspond with the numbers of the municipalities indicated to the left of the municipality name in the table below the maps, the second one is a map of the City of Skopje municipalities, the numbers of this municipalities are shown as 1, x, where "x" is the number of the appropriate municipality.

Municipalities (2013–present)

In March 2013, the following municipalities merged with Kičevo:

Map of the municipalities of North Macedonia before 2013

See also

 List of municipalities in North Macedonia by population
 Statistical regions of North Macedonia
 Administrative divisions of North Macedonia
 List of FIPS region codes: North Macedonia (MK)
 ISO 3166-2:MK, ISO 3166-2 subdivision codes for the Republic of North Macedonia

Notes
 Municipal areas are summations of component areas. As of the 2002 census, area figures for Aerodrom and Butel municipalities are unavailable and included in those of other municipalities in Skopje region
 Municipalities, 10 in total, forming the City of Skopje (Град Скопје)
 Hierarchical Administrative Subdivision Codes (HASC)
 The boundaries for Debar municipality in the Southwestern region were revised in 2004 to include some territory of Rostuša municipality, the predecessor of Mavrovo and Rostuša municipality, in Polog region
 Total area includes  of inland water not distributed by municipality/region

References
 Republic of North Macedonia, State Statistical Office:
 Mapping the Socio-economic Disparities between the Republic of Macedonia's Municipalities (I-IV)
 Census of Population, Households and Dwellings in the Republic of Macedonia 2002 (PDF)
 

 
Subdivisions of North Macedonia
Macedonia, Municipalities
Macedonia 1
Municipalities, Macedonia
North Macedonia geography-related lists